CFGQ-FM (107.3 FM, QR Calgary) is a radio station in Calgary, Alberta. Owned by Corus Entertainment, it simulcasts the news/talk programming of AM sister station CHQR (AM 770). CFGQ's studios are located on 17th Ave SW near Westbrook Mall, while its transmitter is located at 85th Street Southwest and Old Banff Coach Road in western Calgary.

As of Winter 2020, CFGQ is the 7th-most-listened-to radio station in the Calgary market according to a PPM data report released by Numeris.

History
The station was launched on April 15, 1982, as CKIK-FM, and first broadcast an adult album rock format. Throughout the 1980s and much of the 1990s, CKIK (known on-air as 107 KIK FM and later as Rock 107) played a variety of rock formats. Early in its history, the station encountered financial difficulties, which were alleviated in 1985, when Harvey Glatt, Ottawa music impresario and founder of CHEZ-FM, acquired a 75% interest in the station, which he held until 1995.

In September 1997, CKIK flipped to CHR/Top 40 as Power 107. In January 2002, it flipped to hot adult contemporary as The Peak 107.3. In 2004, the station returned to a rock format as classic rock as Q107, after which it adopted its current call letters.

In 2007, Terry DiMonte, formerly associated with CHOM-FM in Montreal, joined CFGQ as its morning host. In December 2011, Terry DiMonte left CFGQ, returning to CHOM in Montreal. In August 2019, the station replaced its morning show with Willy in the Morning from sister station CFMI-FM.

On December 16, 2022, it was reported that CFGQ would launch a new format on January 9, 2023, with CFGQ's remaining local personalities (including afternoon hosts "Tarzan Dan" Freeman and Cam Sullivan) announcing the end of their respective shows. On January 9, 2023, the station flipped to news/talk as an FM simulcast of CHQR, with both stations collectively rebranded as "QR Calgary" .

Rebroadcasters
CFGQ also has an FM transmitter in Banff (CFGQ-FM-2), which broadcasts at 100.1 MHz with an effective radiated power of 92 watts.

Previous logo

References

External links
QR Calgary
CFGQ-FM history - Canadian Communications Foundation

Fgq
Fgq
Fgq
Radio stations established in 1982
1982 establishments in Alberta